Ed McRae (born 13 April 1953) is a Canadian former cyclist. He competed in the sprint and team pursuit events at the 1972 Summer Olympics.

References

External links
 

1953 births
Living people
Canadian male cyclists
Cyclists at the 1972 Summer Olympics
Olympic cyclists of Canada
Sportspeople from Kamloops